An Admiralty is a governmental and/or naval body responsible for the administration of a navy.

List of Admiralties

Germany
 German Imperial Admiralty, Kaiserliche Admiralität
 German Imperial Admiralty Staff, Admiralstab

Netherlands
Admiralty of Amsterdam
Admiralty of Friesland
Admiralty of the Noorderkwartier (also called the "Admiralty of West-Friesland")
Admiralty of Rotterdam (also called the "Admiralty of de Maze")
Admiralty of Zeeland

Russia
Admiralty Board (Russian Empire), the authority responsible for the Imperial Russian Navy
Admiralty Shipyard, a former Imperial admiralty, the Main Admiralty, today a shipyard in Saint Petersburg, Russia

United Kingdom
Admiralty in the 16th century - the Admiralty and Marine Affairs Office (1546-1707) 
Admiralty (United Kingdom), a former military department in command of the Royal Navy from 1707 to 1964
Admiralty Board (United Kingdom), the post-1964 board responsible for the Royal Navy
Board of Admiralty, the board responsible for the Royal Navy from 1628 to 1964
Royal Maritime Auxiliary Service, commonly referred to as the Admiralty
United Kingdom Hydrographic Office, produces the Admiralty brand of charts

Navies